May Blossom is a 1915 American silent drama film directed by Allan Dwan and written by David Belasco based upon his 1884 play. The film stars Russell Bassett, Donald Crisp, Marshall Neilan, Gertrude Norman, and Gertrude Robinson. The film was released on April 15, 1915, by Paramount Pictures.

Plot

Cast  
Russell Bassett as Tom Blossom
Donald Crisp as Steve Harland
Marshall Neilan as Richard Ashcroft
Gertrude Norman as Aunt Deborah
Gertrude Robinson as May Blossom

See also
List of Paramount Pictures films

References

External links 
 
 
 Lobby poster

1915 films
1910s English-language films
Silent American drama films
1915 drama films
Paramount Pictures films
Films directed by Allan Dwan
American black-and-white films
American silent feature films
American films based on plays
1910s American films